The genus name Callitropsis has been used for two different genera in the family Cupressaceae:
Callitropsis Oerst., a monotypic genus with a single species Callitropsis nootkatensis
Callitropsis Compton, a synonym of Callitris